was the third of ten s, and was built for the Imperial Japanese Navy under the "Circle One" Program (Maru Ichi Keikaku).  This vessel should not be confused with the earlier Russo-Japanese War-period  torpedo boat destroyer with the same name.

History
Despite being one of the most powerful classes of destroyers in the world at the time of their completion, none survived the Pacific War.
Murasame, built at the Fujinagata Shipyards in Osaka was laid down on 1 February 1934, launched on 20 June 1935 and commissioned on 7 January 1937.

Operational history
At the time of the attack on Pearl Harbor, Murasame was assigned to Destroyer Division 2 of Destroyer Squadron 4 of the IJN 2nd Fleet, and had sortied from Mako Guard District as part of the "Operation M" (the invasion of the Philippines, covering landings at Vigan and Lingayen Gulf). On 26 December, she collided with minesweeper W-20 off of Kaohsiung, Taiwan, suffering minor damage.

From January 1942, Murasame participated in operations in the Netherlands East Indies, including the invasions of Tarakan Island, Balikpapan and eastern Java. During the Battle of the Java Sea, Murasame engaged a group of Allied destroyers. In March and April, Murasame was based at Subic Bay, from which she assisted in the invasion of Cebu and the blockade of Manila Bay in the Philippines. In May, she returned to Yokosuka Naval Arsenal for repairs.

During the Battle of Midway on 4–6 June, Murasame was part of the aborted Midway Occupation Force under Admiral Nobutake Kondō. In late July, she transferred to Mergui via Singapore to join the Indian Ocean raiding force, but the operation was cancelled due to developments at Guadalcanal, and she returned to Truk on 21 August. During the Battle of the Eastern Solomons on 24 August, she was part of the escort for the battleship , and during most of September, she was an escort for the seaplane tender , exploring the Solomon Islands and Santa Cruz Islands for potential base locations.

In early October, Murasame participated in two "Tokyo Express" high speed transport runs to Guadalcanal or Lae, suffering from minor damage on 5 October in an air attack near Shortland Islands, which necessitated a return to Truk for repairs. In late October through the end of November, Murasame made an additional nine "Tokyo Express" runs. On 25 October 1942 she assisted in rescuing the crew of the cruiser , heavily damaged by aircraft attacks, and the next day took part in the Battle of the Santa Cruz Islands under Admiral Takeo Kurita.  During the First Naval Battle of Guadalcanal on the night of 12–13 November 1942, Murasame assisting in sinking the destroyer  and damaging the cruiser , as well as possibly torpedoing the cruiser . However, during the battle she was also hit by a shell in her forward boiler, and returned to Truk again for repairs. She continued to patrol from Truk through the end of the year, and returned to Yokosuka for repairs in mid January 1943.

In February 1943, Murasame returned to Truk escorting the aircraft carrier , and continued on to Rabaul to resume transport operations to Kolombangara. On the night of 4 March, Murasame and the destroyer  are believed to have sunk the submarine . However, that same night they were detected by radar-equipped American ships in Kula Gulf off Vila, after delivering supplies to the Japanese base there. In a short action, known as the Battle of Blackett Strait, both Japanese ships were sunk; Murasame broke in two from an "extremely violent" explosion after being hit by gunfire and torpedoes from the destroyer  at position . Of her crew, 128 were killed, but 53 survivors, including her captain, Lieutenant Commander Tanegashima, and squadron commander Captain Masao Tachibana later reached Japanese territory. She was removed from the navy list on 1 April 1943.

A memorial monument to the crew of Murasame exists at Kannonzaki, in Yokosuka, Japan.

See also
 Murasame-class destroyer (1958)
 Murasame-class destroyer (1994)

Notes

References

 OCLC 77257764

External links

Naval Historical Center entry on the Murasame

Shiratsuyu-class destroyers
World War II destroyers of Japan
Shipwrecks in the Solomon Sea
1935 ships
World War II shipwrecks in the Pacific Ocean
Maritime incidents in March 1943
Ships built by Fujinagata Shipyards
Naval magazine explosions